Dead and Divine was a five-piece post-hardcore band out of Burlington, Ontario, Canada. Their initial success spawned from their 2005 EP What Really Happened at Lover's Lane on Verona Records (a label created by the band themselves, and Silverstein's Shane Told).

History
Their first EP, What Really Happened at Lover's Lane sold nearly 1,000 copies nationwide, landing them a spot on the Canadian Billboard chart. The band then set off on an independently booked coast to coast Canadian headlining tour that following summer, playing in as many cities as they could.

They spent most of December 2007 recording their Rise Records debut album, The Fanciful, at Interlace Studios with producer Kris Krummet. They shot a music video for "Like Wolves" with director Ben Knechtel. In July 2008, it was announced that Ryan Leger would leave the band in order to be with his girlfriend and newborn daughter. The band found a replacement, Kyle Anderson. Leger later joined Every Time I Die.

In September 2008, the band signed with Distort Entertainment. The band then released The Machines We Are on August 4 and embarked on a Canadian tour with Straight Reads The Line. They again broke into the Billboard Canada and No. 18 on the Canadian Nielsen SoundScan Hard Rock Charts, as well as landing No. 39 on the Canadian Nielsen SoundScan Alternative Charts. The band was nominated for Favourite Punk/Hardcore Group at the CMW Indie Awards. In August 2009, they shot a video for "Neon Jesus" with director Marc Ricciardelli, which was released on September 18, 2009.

Their third album, Antimacy, released on August 11, 2011, debuted at No. 53 on the Canadian Albums Chart.

On April 22, 2012, the band announced that they would be breaking up after one last hometown show in Burlington, Ontario. They cited a hectic touring schedule and a need to focus on personal lives as their reason for splitting. However Tobin says that incessant fighting and disagreements between the band lead to their demise.

Aftermath
On April 14, 2014, vocalist Matt Tobin formed a new band by the name of "Ritual".

Band members
 Matt Tobin – vocals
 Chris LeMasters – guitar
 Kellan Lindsay – bass guitar
 Sebastian Lueth – guitar
 Kelly Bilan – drums
 Pat Simms – guitar (2003–2006)
 Dave McGuire – guitar
 Isi Commisso – bass (2003–2006)
 Will Allen – drums (2003–2007)
 Kyle Anderson – drums

Discography
Studio albums
The Fanciful (March 18, 2008)
The Machines We Are (August 4, 2009)
Antimacy (August 2, 2011)

EPs
Her Name Was Tragedy (2004)
What Really Happened at Lover's Lane (2005)

Videography
 "Like Wolves"
 "Neon Jesus"
 "Asphyxia Fiend"

References

External links
Dead and Divine on Myspace

Canadian post-hardcore musical groups
Canadian metalcore musical groups
Musical groups from the Regional Municipality of Halton
Musical groups established in 2003
Musical groups disestablished in 2012
2003 establishments in Ontario
2012 disestablishments in Ontario